Khvajeh Gir (also Romanized as Khvājeh Gīr) is a village in Liravi-ye Shomali Rural District, in the Central District of Deylam County, Bushehr Province, Iran. At the 2006 census, its population was 123, in 23 families.

References 

Populated places in Deylam County